Senegalia ferruginea is a species of plant in the family Fabaceae. It is found in India and Sri Lanka.

References

ferruginea
Flora of Sri Lanka
Vulnerable plants
Taxonomy articles created by Polbot